Rose Mountain is the sixth studio album by Screaming Females, released on February 24, 2015, by Don Giovanni Records.

Lance Bangs directed a music video for the song "Hopeless," which included animation made by Marissa Paternoster. Bangs also made a two-part documentary about the band, their tour, and the making of the album.

A deluxe version of the album was released digitally for an Australian tour.

Track listing

Accolades

References

Screaming Females albums
Don Giovanni Records albums
2015 albums